The fifth and final season of the American action-comedy television series Chuck was announced on May 13, 2011. It included 13 episodes, which premiered on October 28, 2011, and concluded on January 27, 2012, with a two-hour finale.

Continuing from the eponymous cliffhanger ending of the fourth season finale, "Chuck Versus the Cliffhanger", the fifth season featured the series returning to its roots. With their new-found wealth, Chuck (Zachary Levi) and Sarah Bartowski (Yvonne Strahovski) own the fictional big-box store Buy More, as well as their new freelance spy organization, Carmichael Industries, which includes John Casey (Adam Baldwin) and Morgan Grimes (Joshua Gomez). Meanwhile, Morgan acts as the human possessor of the government database known as the Intersect, and Chuck is forced to act as Morgan's protector in the same way that Sarah and Casey were to Chuck in past seasons.

Production
Series co-creators Josh Schwartz and Chris Fedak expressed a desire to produce a fifth season of Chuck as early as March 2011, when it was revealed that the fourth season finale would be titled "Chuck Versus the Cliffhanger". Fedak later confirmed that the episode, as the title suggests, would have a cliffhanger ending leading into the fifth season. Despite a drastic decline in viewership, the series was renewed for a fifth and final season of 13 episodes on May 13, 2011. The season was scheduled to premiere October 21, 2011 and mark the transition of the series' timeslot from Monday nights to Friday nights at 8/7c, before being rescheduled to one week later, October 28. It was announced on September 8, 2011, that series star Zachary Levi would direct the fifth episode of the season. Levi had previously directed an episode each in the third and fourth seasons.

Cast

Series stars Zachary Levi, Yvonne Strahovski, and Adam Baldwin all expressed an interest to reprise their roles of former Special Agents Charles "Chuck" and Sarah Bartowski, and Colonel John Casey, and an interview with Ryan McPartlin about the future of the series suggested he would also return as Dr. Devon "Captain Awesome" Woodcomb. Chris Fedak later confirmed that Joshua Gomez would reprise his role of Morgan Grimes. The big-box store Buy More, which Chuck purchased in the fourth-season finale, is also featured in the fifth season, with Mark Christopher Lawrence, Scott Krinsky, and Vik Sahay reprising their roles as Michael "Big Mike" Tucker, Jeffrey "Jeff" Barnes, and Lester Patel, respectively. It was confirmed at the 2011 San Diego Comic-Con International that Sarah Lancaster would also reprise her role as Dr. Eleanor "Ellie" Bartowski Woodcomb.

John Casey was given a romantic interest in Gertrude Verbanski, the head of Carmichael Industries' biggest spy competition, Verbanski Corp., said by Fedak to be "the best spy company in the world". It was later announced that The Matrix actress Carrie-Anne Moss would play Verbanski. At Comic-Con, Fedak revealed his desire for Linda Hamilton to return as Mary Elizabeth Bartowski. It was later confirmed that she would appear in the final episode. Brandon Routh returned to the series as Daniel Shaw, a villain that the team had previously defeated. Angus Macfadyen appeared in the final four episodes as the series' final recurring villain, Nicholas Quinn. Other recurring cast members include Bonita Friedericy as Brigadier General Diane Beckman, the head of the NSA and an ally to Carmichael Industries, Mekenna Melvin as Alex McHugh, Casey's daughter and Morgan's girlfriend, and Richard Burgi as Clyde Decker, a CIA agent involved in a rogue operation to take down Chuck.

It was confirmed at the Comic-Con panel that Star Wars actor Mark Hamill would play a villain in the fifth-season premiere. Comedian Craig Kilborn also appeared in the season premiere as Roger Bale, a dangerous man who steals money from other dangerous villains. Losts Jeff Fahey and Smallvilles Justin Hartley guest starred in the season's second episode, as Karl Sneijder, "the president and CEO of diamond giant Natal Jewelers," and his kidnapped brother Wesley, respectively. The fourth episode featured The Offices David Koechner and The Shields Catherine Dent as Crazy Bob, "a jolly Buy More manager," and Jane Robertson, another Buy More manager and "a close friend of Bob's," respectively. The two cross paths with Chuck and Sarah at the company’s Employee of the Year Convention. The fifth episode featured cameo appearances by  Communitys Danny Pudi and Yvette Nicole Brown. The sixth episode featured Rebecca Romijn as Robyn Cunnings, a cold, cunning CIA agent known for her abrasive interrogation technique who is a member of a rogue group which tries to frame Chuck. Stan Lee portrayed himself in the seventh episode, encountering Chuck "in the most unexpected of places." The eighth episode featured Cheryl Ladd as Emma, Sarah's mother, and Tim DeKay as Kieran Ryker, Sarah's former handler. The tenth episode featured Bo Derek as herself.  Mark Pellegrino returned in the final episode as a FULCRUM agent.  Fedak has stated that the writers intended to include various guest stars from past episodes in cameo appearances in the finale, but that it was not possible to include them all.

Cast and characters

Main cast 
 Zachary Levi as Agent Chuck Bartowski (13 episodes)
 Yvonne Strahovski as Agent Sarah Walker (13 episodes)
 Joshua Gomez as Morgan Grimes (13 episodes)
 Ryan McPartlin as Dr. Devon Woodcomb (10 episodes)
 Mark Christopher Lawrence as Michael "Big Mike" Tucker (9 episodes)
 Scott Krinsky as Jeffrey Barnes (11 episodes)
 Vik Sahay as Lester Patel (11 episodes)
 Sarah Lancaster as Dr. Ellie Woodcomb (10 episodes)
 Adam Baldwin as Colonel John Casey (13 episodes)

Supporting cast 
 Mekenna Melvin as Alex McHugh (9 episodes)
 Bonita Friedericy as Brigadier General Diane Beckman (7 episodes)
 Carrie-Anne Moss as Gertrude Verbanski (4 episodes)
 Angus Macfadyen as Nicholas Quinn (4 episodes)
 Richard Burgi as CIA Agent Clyde Decker (3 episodes)
 Brandon Routh as Daniel Shaw (1 episode)
 Linda Hamilton as Mary Elizabeth Bartowski (1 episode)
 Bo Derek as Bo Derek (1 episode)

Episodes

Home media release

References

External links 
 

2011 American television seasons
2012 American television seasons